Saint-Seurin-sur-l'Isle (literally Saint Seurin on the Isle) is a commune in the Gironde department in Nouvelle-Aquitaine in southwestern France. Saint-Seurin-sur-l'Isle station has rail connections to Bordeaux, Périgueux, Brive-la-Gaillarde and Limoges.

Population

See also
 Communes of the Gironde department

References

External links

 Degree Confluence Project

Communes of Gironde